Minister for Training and Workforce Development is a position in the government of Western Australia, most recently held by Liza Harvey of the Liberal Party. The position was first created after the 1933 state election, for the government of Philip Collier, but was abolished in 1943 and not re-created until 1982. It had been a distinct portfolio in most governments since then, albeit under several different names. The minister was responsible for the state government's Department of Training and Workforce Development (DTWD).

Following the WA State Election in 2017, the portfolio no longer exists. The new portfolio is now Education and Training, held by Sue Ellery.

Titles
 24 April 1933 – 23 December 1983: Minister for Employment
 23 December 1983 – 16 March 1987: Minister for Employment and Training
 16 March 1987 – 25 February 1988: Minister for Productivity and Employment
 25 February 1988 – 7 September 1992: Minister for Employment and Training
 7 September 1992 – 16 February 1993: Minister for Employment and Minister for Training (two ministers)
 16 February 1993 – 1 July 2001: Minister for Employment and Training
 1 July 2001 – 17 November 2009: Minister for Training
 17 November 2009 – 17 March 2017: Minister for Training and Workforce Development
 17 March 2017 – present: Minister for Education and Training

List of ministers

See also
 Treasurer of Western Australia
 Minister for Education (Western Australia)
 Minister for Small Business (Western Australia)
 Minister for State Development (Western Australia)

References

 David Black (2014), The Western Australian Parliamentary Handbook (Twenty-Third Edition). Perth [W.A.]: Parliament of Western Australia.

Training
Minister for Training